Nicolò Trevisa (died 1498) was a Roman Catholic prelate who served as Bishop of Ceneda (1474–1498).

On 15 June 1474, Nicolò Trevisa was appointed during the papacy of Pope Sixtus IV as Bishop of Ceneda.
He served as Bishop of Ceneda until his death on 10 Jan 1498.

References

External links and additional sources
 (for Chronology of Bishops) 
 (for Chronology of Bishops) 

15th-century Italian Roman Catholic bishops
Bishops appointed by Pope Sixtus IV
1498 deaths